Kali, also referred to as Mahakali, Bhadrakali, and Kalika, is a Hindu goddess who is considered to be the goddess of ultimate power, time, destruction and change in Shaktism. In this tradition, she is considered as a ferocious form of goddess Adi Shakti, the supreme of all powers, or the ultimate reality. She is the first of the ten Mahavidyas in the Hindu tantric tradition.

Kali's earliest appearance is when she emerged from Durga. She is regarded as the ultimate manifestation of Shakti, the primordial cosmic energy, and the mother of all living beings. The goddess is stated to destroy evil in order to defend the innocent. Over time, Kali has been worshipped by devotional movements and Tàntric sects variously as the Divine Mother, Mother of the Universe, Principal energy Adi Shakti. Shakta Hindu and Tantric sects additionally worship her as the ultimate reality or Brahman. She is also seen as the divine protector and the one who bestows moksha, or liberation.

Etymology
Kālī is the feminine form of Kāla (an epithet of Shiva) and thus the consort of Shiva. The homonym  (appointed time) is distinct from kāla (black), but these became associated through popular etymology. She is called Kali Mata ("the dark mother") and also kālī  which can be read here either as a proper name or as a description "the dark or black one".

Origins
Although the word  appears as early as the Atharva Veda, the first use of it as a proper name is in the Kathaka Grhya Sutra (19.7).

According to David Kinsley, Kāli is first mentioned in Hindu tradition as a distinct goddess around 600 AD, and these texts "usually place her on the periphery of Hindu society or on the battlefield." She is often regarded as the Shakti of Shiva, and is closely associated with him in various Puranas.

Possible Near Eastern influences
Kālī shares some characteristics with some ancient Near Eastern goddesses, such as drinking blood like the Egyptian goddess Sekhmet and wearing a necklace of heads and a belt of severed hands like the Levantine goddess Anat, and Kālī herself might have been influenced by Anat and Sekhmet.

Levantine Anat
The Bronze Age epic cycles of the Levantine city of Ugarit include a myth according to which the warrior goddess Anat started attacking warriors, with the text of the myth describing the goddess as gloating and her heart filling with joy and her liver with laughter while attaching the heads of warriors to her back and girding hands to her waist until she is pacified by a message of peace sent by her brother and consort, the god Baʿlu.

The Hindu goddess Kālī similarly wore a necklace of severed heads and a girdle of severed hands, and was pacified by her consort, Śiva, throwing himself under her feet. The sickle sword wielded by Kālī might also have been connected to similar sickle swords used in early dynastic Mesopotamia.

Egyptian Sekhmet
According to an Ancient Egyptian myth, called , the ancient Egyptian supreme god, the Sun-god Ra, suspected that mankind was plotting against him, and so he sent the goddess Hathor, who was the incarnation of his violent feminine aspect, the Eye of Ra, to destroy his enemies.

Hathor appeared as the lion-goddess Sekhmet and carried out Ra's orders until she became so captured by her blood-lust that she would not stop despite Ra himself becoming distressed and wishing an end to the killing. Therefore, Ra concocted a ruse whereby a plain was flooded with beer which had been dyed red, which Sekhmet mistook for blood and drank until she became too inebriated to continue killing, this saving humanity from destruction.

Similarly, while killing demons, Kālī became ecstatic with the joy of battle and slaughter and refused to stop, so that the Devas feared she would destroy the world, and she was stopped through ruse when her consort Śiva threw himself under her feet.

Legends
Her most well-known appearance is on the battlefield in the sixth century Devi Mahatmyam. The deity of the first chapter of Devi Mahatmyam is Mahakali, who appears from the body of sleeping Vishnu as goddess Yoga Nidra to wake him up in order to protect Brahma and the World from two asuras, Madhu-Kaitabha. When Vishnu woke up he started a war against the two asuras. After a long battle with Lord Vishnu when the two demons were undefeated Mahakali took the form of Mahamaya to enchant the two asuras. When Madhu and Kaitabha were enchanted by Mahakali, Vishnu killed them.

In later chapters, the story of two asuras who were destroyed by Kali can be found. Chanda and Munda attack the goddess Durga. Durga responds with such anger it causes her face to turn dark, resulting in Kali appearing out of her forehead. Kali's appearance is dark blue, gaunt with sunken eyes, and wearing a tiger skin sari and a garland of human heads. She immediately defeats the two asuras. Later in the same battle, the asura Raktabija is undefeated because of his ability to reproduce himself from every drop of his blood that reaches the ground. Countless Raktabija clones appear on the battlefield. Kali eventually defeats him by sucking his blood before it can reach the ground, and eating the numerous clones. Kinsley writes that Kali represents "Durga's personified wrath, her embodied fury".

Other origin stories involve Parvati and Shiva. Parvati is typically portrayed as a benign and friendly goddess. The Linga Purana describes Shiva asking Parvati to defeat the asura Daruka, who received a boon that would only allow a female to kill him. Parvati merges with Shiva's body, reappearing as Kali to defeat Daruka and his armies. Her bloodlust gets out of control, only calming when Shiva intervenes. The Vamana Purana has a different version of Kali's relationship with Parvati. When Shiva addresses Parvati as Kali, "the dark blue one", she is greatly offended. Parvati performs austerities to lose her dark complexion and becomes Gauri, the golden one. Her dark sheath becomes Kausiki, who while enraged, creates Kali.

Kāli appears in the verse of the Mahabharata (10.8.64). She is called  (literally, "dark blue night") and appears to the Pandava soldiers in dreams, until finally, she appears amidst the fighting during an attack by Drona's son Ashwatthama.

Slayer of Raktabīja

In Kāli's most famous legend, Durga and her assistants, the Matrikas, wound the demon Raktabīja, in various ways and with a variety of weapons in an attempt to destroy him. They soon find that they have worsened the situation for with every drop of blood that is dripped from Raktabīja, he reproduces a duplicate of himself. The battlefield becomes increasingly filled with his duplicates.
 Durga summons Kāli to combat the demons. The  Devi Mahatmyam describes:

Kali consumes Raktabīja and his duplicates, and dances on the corpses of the slain. In Devi Mahatmya version of this story, Kali is also described as a Matrika and as a Shakti or power of Devi. She is given the epithet  (Chamunda), i.e. the slayer of the demons Chanda and Munda. Chamunda is very often identified with Kali and is very much like her in appearance and habit. In Tantric Kali Kula Shaktism, Kali is the supreme goddess and she is source of All Goddesses. In Yoginī Tantra, Kālī kills Kolasura and Ghorasura.

Iconography and forms
The goddess has two depictions: the popular four-armed form and the ten-armed Mahakali avatar. In both, she is described as being black in colour, though she is often seen as blue in popular Indian art.  Her eyes are described as red with intoxication and rage. Her hair is disheveled, small fangs sometimes protrude out of her mouth, and her tongue is lolling. Sometimes she dons a skirt made of human arms and a garland of human heads. Other times, she is seen wearing a tiger skin. She is also accompanied by serpents and a jackal while standing on the calm and prostrate Shiva, usually right foot forward to symbolize the more popular dakṣiṇācāra ("right-hand path"), as opposed to the more infamous and transgressive vamachara ("left-hand path"). These serpents and jackals are shown to drink the blood of Raktabīja head, which is dripping while the goddess carries it in her hand, and preventing it from falling on the ground.

In the ten-armed form of Mahakali, she is depicted as shining like a blue stone. She has ten faces, ten feet, and three eyes for each head. She has ornaments decked on all her limbs. There is no association with Shiva.

The Kalika Purana describes Kali as possessing a soothing dark complexion, as perfectly beautiful, riding a lion, four-armed, holding a sword and blue lotus, while her right hands are in varabhaya posture, her hair unrestrained, body firm and youthful.

When Sri Ramakrishna once asked a devotee why one would prefer to worship Mother over him, this devotee rhetorically replied, "Maharaj, when they are in trouble your devotees come running to you. But, where do you run when you are in trouble?"

Popular form

Classic depictions of Kali share several features, as follows:

Kali's most common four armed iconographic image shows each hand carrying variously a Khadga (crescent-shaped sword or a giant sickle), a trishul (trident), a severed head, and a bowl or skull-cup (kapāla) collecting the blood of the severed head. This is the form of Bhima Kali.

Two of these hands (usually the left) are holding a sword and a severed head. The sword signifies divine knowledge and the human head signifies human ego which must be slain by divine knowledge in order to attain moksha. The other two hands (usually the right) are in the abhaya (fearlessness) and varada (blessing) mudras, which means her initiated devotees (or anyone worshipping her with a true heart) will be saved as she will guide them here and in the hereafter. This is the form of Dakshina Kali.

She wears a garland of human heads, variously enumerated at 108 (an auspicious number in Hinduism and the number of countable beads on a japa mala or rosary for repetition of mantras) or 51, which represents Varnamala or the Garland of letters of the Sanskrit alphabet, Devanagari. Hindus believe Sanskrit is a language of dynamism, and each of these letters represents a form of energy, or a form of Kali. Therefore, she is generally seen as the mother of language, and all mantras.

She is often depicted naked which symbolizes her being beyond the covering of Maya since she is pure (nirguna) being-consciousness-bliss and far above Prakriti. She is shown as very dark as she is Brahman in its supreme unmanifest state. She has no permanent qualities—she will continue to exist even when the universe ends. It is therefore believed that the concepts of color, light, good, and bad do not apply to her.

Mahakali

Mahakali (Sanskrit: Mahākālī, Devanagari: महाकाली, Bengali: মহাকালী), literally translated as "Great Kali," is sometimes considered as a greater form of Kali, identified with the Ultimate reality of Brahman. It can also be used as an honorific of the Goddess Kali, signifying her greatness by the prefix "Mahā-". Mahakali, in Sanskrit, is etymologically the feminized variant of Mahakala or Great Time (which is interpreted also as Death), an epithet of the God Shiva in Hinduism. Mahakali is the presiding Goddess of the first episode of the Devi Mahatmya. Here, she is depicted as Devi in her universal form as Shakti. Here Devi serves as the agent who allows the cosmic order to be restored.

Kali is depicted in the Mahakali form as having ten heads, ten arms, and ten legs. Each of her ten hands is carrying a various implement which varies in different accounts, but each of these represents the power of one of the Devas or Hindu Gods and are often the identifying weapon or ritual item of a given Deva. The implication is that Mahakali subsumes and is responsible for the powers that these deities possess and this is in line with the interpretation that Mahakali is identical with Brahman. While not displaying ten heads, an "ekamukhi" or one headed image may be displayed with ten arms, signifying the same concept: the powers of the various Gods come only through her grace.

The name Mahakali, when kali is rendered to mean "black", translates to Japanese as Daikoku (大黒).

Dakshinakali

Dakshinakali is the most popular form of Kali in Bengal. She is the benevolent mother, who protects her devotees and children from mishaps and misfortunes. There are various versions for the origin of the name Dakshinakali. Dakshina refers to the gift given to a priest before performing a ritual or to one's guru. Such gifts are traditionally given with the right hand. Dakshinakali's two right hands are usually depicted in gestures of blessing and giving of boons. One version of the origin of her name comes from the story of Yama, lord of death, who lives in the south (dakshina). When Yama heard Kali's name, he fled in terror, and so those who worship Kali are said to be able to overcome death itself.

Dakshinakali is typically shown with her right foot on Shiva's chest—while depictions showing Kali with her left foot on Shiva's chest depict the even more fearsome Vamakali. Vamakali is usually worshipped by non-householders.

The pose shows the conclusion of an episode in which Kali was rampaging out of control after destroying many demons. Lord Vishnu, Kali's brother, confronted Kali in an attempt to cool her down. She was unable to see beyond the limitless power of her rage and Lord Vishnu had to move out of her way. Seeing this the devas became more fearful, afraid that in her rampage, Kali would not stop until she destroyed the entire universe. Shiva saw only one solution to prevent Kali's endless destruction. Lord Shiva lay down on the battlefield so that Goddess Mahakali would have to step on him. When she saw her consort under her foot, Kali realized that she had gone too far. Filled with grief for the damage she had done, her blood-red tongue hung from her mouth, calming her down. In some interpretations of the story, Shiva was attempting to receive Kali's grace by receiving her foot on his chest.

There are many different interpretations of the pose held by Dakshinakali, including those of the 18th and 19th-century bhakti poet-devotees such as Ramprasad Sen. Some have to do with battle imagery and tantric metaphysics. The most popular is a devotional view.

According to Rachel Fell McDermott, the poets portrayed Shiva as "the devotee who falls at [Kali's] feet in devotion, in the surrender of his ego, or in hopes of gaining moksha by her touch." In fact, Shiva is said to have become so enchanted by Kali that he performed austerities to win her, and having received the treasure of her feet, held them against his heart in reverence.

The growing popularity of worship of a more benign form of Kali, Dakshinakali, is often attributed to Krishnananda Agamavagisha. He was a noted Bengali leader of the 17th century and author of a Tantra encyclopedia called Tantrasara. Kali reportedly appeared to him in a dream and told him to popularize her in a particular form that would appear to him the following day. The next morning he observed a young woman making cow dung patties. While placing a patty on a wall, she stood in the alidha pose, with her right foot forward. When she saw Krishnananda watching her, she was embarrassed and put her tongue between her teeth. Krishnananda took his previous worship of Kali out of the cremation grounds and into a more domestic setting. Krishnananda Agamavagisha was also the guru of the Kali devotee and poet Ramprasad Sen.

Samhara Kali
Samhara Kali, also called Vama Kali, is the embodiment of the power of destruction. The chief goddess of Tantric texts, Samhara Kali is the most dangerous and powerful form of Kali. Samhara Kali takes form when Kali steps out with her left foot holding her sword in her right hand. She is the Kali of death, destruction and is worshiped by tantrics. As Samhara Kali she gives death and liberation. According to the Mahakala Samhita, Samhara Kali is two armed and black in complexion. She stands on a corpse and holds a freshly cut head and a plate to collect the dripping blood. She is worshiped by warriors, tantrics – the followers of Tantra.

Other forms
Other forms of Kali popularly worshipped in Bengal include Raksha Kali (form of Kali worshipped for protection against epidemics and drought), Bhadra Kali and Guhya Kali. Kali is said to have 8, 12, or 21 different forms according to different traditions. The popular forms are Adya kali, Chintamani Kali, Sparshamani Kali, Santati Kali, Siddhi Kali, Dakshina Kali, Bhadra Kali, Smashana Kali, Adharvana Bhadra Kali, Kamakala Kali, Guhya Kali, Hamsa Kali,Shyama Kali, and Kalasankarshini Kali.

Symbolism
Interpretations of the symbolic meanings of Kali's appearance vary depending on Tantric or devotional approach, and on whether one views her image in a symbolic, allegorical or mystical fashion.

Physical form

There are many varied depictions of the different forms of Kali. The most common form shows her with four arms and hands, showing aspects of both creation and destruction. The two right hands are often held out in blessing, one in a mudra saying "fear not" (abhayamudra), the other conferring boons. Her left hands hold a severed head and blood-covered sword. The sword severs the bondage of ignorance and ego, represented by the severed head. One interpretation of Kali's tongue is that the red tongue symbolizes the rajasic nature being conquered by the white (symbolizing sattvic) nature of the teeth. Her blackness represents that she is nirguna, beyond all qualities of nature, and transcendent.

The most widespread interpretation of Kali's extended tongue involve her embarrassment over the sudden realization that she has stepped on her husband's chest. Kali's sudden "modesty and shame" over that act is the prevalent interpretation among Odia Hindus. The biting of the tongue conveys the emotion of lajja or modesty, an expression that is widely accepted as the emotion being expressed by Kali. In Bengal also, Kali's protruding tongue is "widely accepted... as a sign of speechless embarrassment: a gesture very common among Bengalis."

The twin earrings of Kali are small embryos. This is because Kali likes devotees who have childlike qualities in them. The forehead of Kali is seen to be as luminous as the full moon and eternally giving out ambrosia.

Kali is often shown standing with her right foot on Shiva's chest. This represents an episode where Kali was out of control on the battlefield, such that she was about to destroy the entire universe.  Shiva pacified her by laying down under her foot to pacify and calm her. Shiva is sometimes shown with a blissful smile on his face. She is typically shown with a garland of severed heads, often numbering fifty. This can symbolize the letters of the Sanskrit alphabet and therefore as the primordial sound of Aum from which all creation proceeds. The severed arms which make up her skirt represent her devotee's karma that she has taken on.

Mother Nature
The name Kali means Kala or force of time. When there were neither the creation, nor the sun, the moon, the planets, and the earth, there was only darkness and everything was created from the darkness. The Dark appearance of Kali represents the darkness from which everything was born. Her complexion is black. As she is also the goddess of Preservation, Kali is worshiped as the preserver of nature. Kali is standing calm on Shiva, her appearance represents the preservation of mother nature. Her free, long and black hair represents nature's freedom from civilization. Under the third eye of kali, the signs of both sun, moon, and fire are visible which represent the driving forces of nature. Kali is not always thought of as a Dark Goddess. Despite Kali's origins in battle, she evolved to a full-fledged symbol of Mother Nature in her creative, nurturing and devouring aspects. She is referred to as a great and loving primordial Mother Goddess in the Hindu tantric tradition. In this aspect, as Mother Goddess, she is referred to as Kali Ma, meaning Kali Mother, and millions of Hindus revere her as such.

There are several interpretations of the symbolism behind the commonly represented image of Kali standing on Shiva's supine form. A common interpretation is that Shiva symbolizes purusha, the universal unchanging aspect of reality, or pure consciousness. Kali represents Prakriti, nature or matter, sometimes seen as having a feminine quality. The merging of these two qualities represent ultimate reality.

A tantric interpretation sees Shiva as consciousness and Kali as power or energy. Consciousness and energy are dependent upon each other, since Shiva depends on Shakti, or energy, in order to fulfill his role in creation, preservation, and destruction. In this view, without Shakti, Shiva is a corpse—unable to act.

Worship

Mantras
Kali could be considered a general concept, like Durga, and is primarily worshiped in the Kali Kula sect of worship. The closest way of direct worship is Maha Kali or Bhadrakali (Bhadra in Sanskrit means 'gentle'). Kali is worshiped as one of the 10 Mahavidya forms of Adi Parashakti. One mantra for worship to Kali is:

In fact, chanting of Mahishasura Mardhini is a daily ritual in all Hindu Bengali homes especially during Navratri / Durga Pujo as it is called.

The chant of the first chapter of Durga Saptashati is considered a very important hymn to Sri Mahakali as Devi Mahatmyam / Durga Saptashati dates back to the Upanishadic Era of Indological literature.

Tantra

Goddesses play an important role in the study and practice of Tantra Yoga, and are affirmed to be as central to discerning the nature of reality as are the male deities.  Although Parvati is often said to be the recipient and student of Shiva's wisdom in the form of Tantras, it is Kali who seems to dominate much of the Tantric iconography, texts, and rituals. In many sources Kāli is praised as the highest reality or greatest of all deities. The Nirvana-tantra says the gods Brahma, Vishnu, and Shiva all arise from her like bubbles in the sea, ceaselessly arising and passing away, leaving their original source unchanged. The Niruttara-tantra and the Picchila-tantra declare all of Kāli's mantras to be the greatest and the Yogini-tantra, Kamakhya-tantra and the Niruttara-tantra all proclaim Kāli vidyas (manifestations of Mahadevi, or "divinity itself").  They declare her to be an essence of her own form (svarupa) of the Mahadevi.

In the Mahanirvana-tantra, Kāli is one of the epithets for the primordial ṥakti, and in one passage Shiva praises her:

The figure of Kāli conveys death, destruction, and the consuming aspects of reality. As such, she is also a "forbidden thing", or even death itself. In the Pancatattva ritual, the sadhaka boldly seeks to confront Kali, and thereby assimilates and transforms her into a vehicle of salvation. This is clear in the work of the Karpuradi-stotra, short praise of Kāli describing the Pancatattva ritual unto her, performed on cremation grounds. (Samahana-sadhana);

The Karpuradi-stotra, dated to approximately 10th century ACE, clearly indicates that Kāli is more than a terrible, vicious, slayer of demons who serves Durga or Shiva. Here, she is identified as the supreme mother of the universe, associated with the five elements. In union with Lord Shiva, she creates and destroys worlds. Her appearance also takes a different turn, befitting her role as ruler of the world and object of meditation. In contrast to her terrible aspects, she takes on hints of a more benign dimension. She is described as young and beautiful, has a gentle smile, and makes gestures with her two right hands to dispel any fear and offer boons. The more positive features exposed offer the distillation of divine wrath into a goddess of salvation, who rids the sadhaka of fear. Here, Kali appears as a symbol of triumph over death.

In Bengali tradition

Kali is a central figure in late medieval Bengal devotional literature, with such notable devotee poets as Kamalakanta Bhattacharya (1769–1821), Ramprasad Sen (1718–1775). With the exception of being associated with Parvati as Shiva's consort, Kāli is rarely pictured in Hindu legends and iconography as a motherly figure until Bengali devotions beginning in the early eighteenth century. Even in Bengāli tradition her appearance and habits change little, if at all.

The Tantric approach to Kāli is to display courage by confronting her on cremation grounds in the dead of night, despite her terrible appearance. In contrast, the Bengali devotee adopts the attitude of a child, coming to love her unreservedly. In both cases, the goal of the devotee is to become reconciled with death and to learn acceptance of the way that things are. These themes are addressed in Rāmprasād's work. Rāmprasād comments in many of his other songs that Kāli is indifferent to his wellbeing, causes him to suffer, brings his worldly desires to nothing and his worldly goods to ruin. He also states that she does not behave like a mother should and that she ignores his pleas:

To be a child of Kāli, Rāmprasād asserts, is to be denied of earthly delights and pleasures. Kāli is said to refrain from giving that which is expected. To the devotee, it is perhaps her very refusal to do so that enables her devotees to reflect on dimensions of themselves and of reality that go beyond the material world.

A significant portion of Bengali devotional music features Kāli as its central theme and is known as Shyama Sangeet ("Music of the Night"). Mostly sung by male vocalists, today women have taken to this form of music.

Kāli is especially venerated in the festival of Kali Puja in eastern India – celebrated when the new moon day of Ashwin month coincides with the festival of Diwali. The practice of animal sacrifice is still practiced during Kali Puja in Bengal, Orissa, and Assam, though it is rare outside of those areas. The Hindu temples where this takes place involves the ritual slaying of goats, chickens and sometimes male water buffalos. Throughout India, the practice is becoming less common. The rituals in eastern India temples where animals are killed are generally led by Brahmin priests. A number of Tantric Puranas specify the ritual for how the animal should be killed. A Brahmin priest will recite a mantra in the ear of the animal to be sacrificed, in order to free the animal from the cycle of life and death. Groups such as People for Animals continue to protest animal sacrifice based on court rulings forbidding the practice in some locations.

In Tantric Buddhism

Tantric Kali cults such as the Kaula and Krama had a strong influence on Tantric Buddhism, as can be seen in fierce-looking yoginis and dakinis such as Vajrayogini and Krodikali.

In Tibet, Krodikali (alt. Krodhakali, Kālikā, Krodheśvarī, Krishna Krodhini) is known as Tröma Nagmo (Wylie: , English: "The Black Wrathful Lady"). She features as a key deity in the practice tradition of Chöd founded by Machig Labdron and is seen as a fierce form of Vajrayogini. Other similar fierce deities include the dark blue Ugra Tara and the lion-faced Simhamukha.

Worship in the Western world

Theorized early worship
A form of Kali worship may have already transmitted to the west already in Medieval times by the wandering Romani. A few authors have drawn parallels between Kali worship and the ceremonies of the annual pilgrimage in honor of Saint Sarah, also known as Sara-la-Kali ("Sara the Black"), held at Saintes-Maries-de-la-Mer, a place of pilgrimage for Roma in the Camargue, in southern France. Ronald Lee (2001) states:

In modern times

An academic study of modern-day western Kali enthusiasts noted that, "as shown in the histories of all cross-cultural religious transplants, Kali devotionalism in the West must take on its own indigenous forms if it is to adapt to its new environment." Rachel Fell McDermott, Professor of Asian and Middle Eastern Cultures at Columbia University and author of several books on Kali, has noted the evolving views in the West regarding Kali and her worship. In 1998 McDermott wrote that:

By 2003, she amended her previous view.

In Réunion

In Réunion, a part of France in the Indian Ocean, veneration for Saint Expeditus is very popular. The Malbars have Tamil ancestry but are, at least nominally, Catholics.
The saint is identified with Kali.

In popular culture

The tongue and lips logo of the band The Rolling Stones, created in 1971, was inspired by the stuck-out tongue of Kali.

A version of Kali is on the cover of the first issue of feminist magazine Ms., published in 1972. Here, Kali's many arms symbolize the many tasks of the contemporary American woman.

A Thuggee cult of Kali worshippers are villains in Indiana Jones and the Temple of Doom (1984), an action-adventure film which takes place in 1935.

Mahakali — Anth Hi Aarambh Hai (2017) is an Indian television series in which  Parvati (Mahakali), Shiva's consort, assumes varied forms to destroy evil and protect the innocent.

References

Further reading

 
 
 
 
 
 
 
 Loriliai Biernacki, Renowned Goddess of Desire: Women, Sex, and Speech in Tantra Oxford Scholarship Online: September 2007, 
 
 
 Shanmukha Anantha Natha and Shri Ma Kristina Baird, Divine Initiation Shri Kali Publications (2001)  – Has a chapter on Mahadevi with a commentary on the Devi Mahatmyam from the Markandeya Purana.
 Ajit Mookerjee, Kali: The Feminine Force 
 Swami Satyananda Saraswati, Kali Puja 
 Ramprasad Sen, Grace and Mercy in Her Wild Hair: Selected Poems to the Mother Goddess 
 Sir John Woodroffe (a.k.a. Arthur Avalon) Hymns to the Goddess and Hymn to Kali 
 Robert E. Svoboda, Aghora, at the left hand of God 
 Dimitri Kitsikis, L'Orocc, dans l'âge de Kali 
 Lex Hixon, Mother of the Universe: Visions of the Goddess and Tantric Hymns of Enlightenment 
 Neela Bhattacharya Saxena, In the Beginning is Desire: Tracing Kali's Footprints in Indian Literature 
 The Goddess Kali of Kolkata by Shoma A. Chatterji
 Dictionary of Hindu Lore and Legend by Anna Dallapiccola
  In Praise of The Goddess: The Devimahatmyam and Its Meaning by Devadatta Kali
 Seeking Mahadevi: Constructing the Identities of the Hindu Great Goddess Edited by Tracy Pintchman
 The Rise of the Goddess in the Hindu Tradition by Tracy Pintchman
 Narasimhananda, Swami, Prabuddha Bharata, January 2016, The Phalaharini Kali.

External links
 Kali at the Encyclopædia Britannica

Death goddesses
Destroyer goddesses
Creator goddesses 
Forms of Parvati
Hindu goddesses
Justice goddesses
Mahavidyas
Mother goddesses
Time and fate goddesses
Supernatural beings identified with Christian saints
War goddesses
Lion deities